Sispony is a village in Andorra, located in the parish of La Massana.

Gallery

See also

References

Populated places in Andorra
La Massana